Mount McKenzie is a locality on the eastern side of the Barossa Council area in South Australia. It is traversed by Eden Valley Road, between Angaston and Eden Valley. The current boundaries of the locality were set in May 2003 for the long-established name for the area. The school opened in 1882, but has long since closed. The community hall founded in 1926 is still active. Mount McKenzie Post Office opened as a postal receiving office on 2 January 1914, became a regular post office in June 1915, and closed in 1965.

The Collingrove Hillclimb course is on the eastern side of Mount McKenzie.

References

Towns in South Australia